The Ivory Coast women's national football team (recognized as Côte d'Ivoire by FIFA) represents Ivory Coast in international women's football and is controlled by the Ivorian Football Federation. They played their first international match in 1988. The team is currently ranked 64th in the FIFA Women's World Rankings and as the 6th best team in CAF.

History

The beginning
In 1985, almost no country in the world had a women's national football team, including Ivory Coast who did not play their first FIFA recognised match until 1988 when they participated in the 1988 FIFA Women's Invitation Tournament.  The country was in Group A. On 1 June, they lost to the Netherlands 0–3 in a game in Foshan.  On 3 June, they lost to Canada 0–6 in a game in Foshan.  In a game on 5 June, they lost to China 1–8 in a game in Guangzhou. In 1992, they competed at the 1st Lyon'ne Cup — Women, held in Lyon, France from 17 to 20 April. Ivory Coast was in the nation's group.  They lost to the United States U20 team 0–4, lost to the CIS team 0–3 and lost to France 1–6. In 2002, the team competed in 2 matches. In 2003, they played in 0 matches.  In 2004, they played in 0 matches.  In 2005, they played in 3 matches.  In 2006, they played in 2 matches. In 2006, the team had 3 training sessions a week. In 2005, they played in the women's Tournoi de Solidarité in Dakar, Senegal. On 18 May, they lost to Mali 1–6.  On 20 May, they tied Senegal 3–3.  They did not make the finals and overall finished last in the tournament. On 17 May 2006 in Dakar, Togo tied Ivory Coast 3–3. In 2007, the country competed at the Tournoi de Cinq Nations] held in Ouagadougou. On 2 September, they tied Mali 1–1 with Rita Akaffou scoring for the team in the 65th minute.  On 5 September, they beat Togo 5–0 before Togo was disqualified from the competition for bringing a club team.  On 6 September, they lost to Mali 1–2. In 2010, the country had a team at the African Women's Championships during the preliminary rounds.  In the round, they beat Guinea 5–1. They lost to Malawi 4–2 in the return leg. In the 2010, Women's Championship in Africa, they lost in the preliminary round in March, they beat Gabon at home and away 2–1 and 3–1.  In the first round against Nigeria, they lost both matches by scores of 1–2 and 1–3. The country did not have a team competing at the 2011 All Africa Games.

The national team has trained in Abidjan.  , the country did not have an under-17 or under-20 side. In June 2012, the team was ranked 67th in the world by FIFA and the 6th best team in CAF.  This was an improvement of four places from March 2012 when they were ranked 71st in the world.  The team's worst ever ranking was in 2011 when they were ranked 136th in the world.  Other rankings include 73 in 2006, 75 in 2007, 74 in 2008, 92 in 2009, and 77 in 2010.

However, in 2014 African Women's Championship, Ivory Coast surprised everyone by passing through into the semi-final, and later, they shocked Africa by beating giant South Africa, marked for the first time they would play in FIFA Women's World Cup, in Canada 2015. In the later tournament, the World Cup, they were eliminated with three total losses to Germany (0–10), Thailand (2–3) and Norway (1–3). Despite having lost all, Ange N'Guessan's goal over Norway was voted as one of ten best goal in the whole tournament.

Background and development
Early development of the women's game at the time colonial powers brought football to the continent was limited, as colonial powers in the region tended to take concepts of patriarchy and women's participation in sport with them to local cultures that had similar concepts already embedded in them. The lack of later development of the national team on a wider international level symptomatic of all African teams is a result of several factors, including limited access to education, poverty amongst women in the wider society, and fundamental inequality present in the society that occasionally allows for female-specific human rights abuses.  When quality female football players are developed, they tend to leave for greater opportunities abroad. Continent-wide, funding is also an issue, with most development money coming from FIFA, not the national football association. Future success for women's football in Africa is dependent on improved facilities and access by women to these facilities.  Attempting to commercialise the game and make it commercially viable is not the solution, as demonstrated by the current existence of many youth and women's football camps held throughout the continent.

Football is the fourth most popular girls' sport, trailing behind handball, basketball and athletics. A women's football program was set up in the country in 1975 and girls' football is played in schools. Player registration starts at nine years of age. In 2006, there were 610 registered female players, 560 of whom were senior players and 50 were under 18 years of age.  This was an increase from 2002 when there were 130 registered female players, 2003 when there were 220, 2004 when there were 253, and 2005 when there were 428 registered players. In 2006, there were 123 football clubs in the country, of which 11 were women's-only sides. As of 2009, there are 36 senior teams and 4 youth teams for women.  A school based competition exists.

The national federation was created in 1960 and became FIFA affiliated in 1964.  Their kit includes orange shirts, white shorts and green socks.  The national committee does not have a full-time employee in charge of women's football.  Representation of women's football is not guaranteed in the federation's constitution. The FIFA trigramme is CIV. A FIFA-run women's MA football course was run in the country in 2007.

Results and fixtures

The following is a list of match results within the last 12 months.

Legend

2022
 

Source :Global archive

Coaching staff

Current coaching staff

Manager history

 Adélaïde Koudougnon (2004–2010)
 Clémentine Touré (2010–)

Players

Up-to-date caps, goals, and statistics are not publicly available; therefore, caps and goals listed may be incorrect.

Current squad
The following players were  called up for the Friendly game  against  on 23 June 2022.

Caps and goals accurate up to and including 26 July 2021.

Recent call-ups
The following players have been called up to a Ivory Coast  squad in the past 12 months.

Records

Individual records

*Active players in bold, statistics correct as of 26 July 2021.

Most capped players

Top goalscorers

Competitive record

FIFA Women's World Cup

Olympic Games

*Draws include knockout matches decided on penalty kicks.

Africa Women Cup of Nations

African Games

WAFU Women's Cup record

Honours

All−time record against FIFA recognized nations
The list shown below shows the Djibouti national football team all−time international record against opposing nations.
*As of xxxxxx after match against  xxxx.
Key

Record per opponent
*As ofxxxxx after match against  xxxxx.
Key

The following table shows Djibouti's all-time official international record per opponent:

See also

Sport in Ivory Coast
Football in Ivory Coast
Women's football in Ivory Coast
Ivory Coast men's national football team

References

External links
Official website
FIFA profile

 
African women's national association football teams
1988 establishments in Ivory Coast